Nexenta by DDN, Inc., is a subsidiary of DataDirect Networks that markets computer software for data storage and backup, headquartered in San Jose, California. Nexenta develops the products NexentaStor, NexentaCloud, NexentaFusion, and NexentaEdge. It was founded as Nexenta Systems, Inc., in 2005.

History

Origins 
In 2005, Nexenta was founded by Alex Aizman and Dmitry Yusupov, software developers and former executives at network vendor Silverback (later acquired by Brocade). Aizman and Yusupov previously worked together as the authors of the open source iSCSI initiator software in the Linux kernel.

The company was created to support the open source Nexenta OS project after Sun Microsystems released the bulk of its Solaris operating system under free software licenses as OpenSolaris. Nexenta OS was an operating system that integrated Sun's Solaris kernel and core technologies with applications from the popular Debian and Ubuntu operating systems.

Nexenta has been acquired by DataDirect Networks, it claims to aim for "a developer of high-performance storage for modern workloads including artificial intelligence and big data", in May 2019.

Data storage 
The company's entry into the data storage included use at Stanford University in 2012 and 2013.
The field had been dominated by companies such as EMC Corporation, DataDirect Networks and NetApp, who sold hardware storage appliances. 

Nexenta intended to compete by creating a storage system that did not require specialized hardware. Instead of producing hardware, the company would provide software to run on lower-costing commodity computing hardware, a model later marketed as software defined storage.

Partnerships and open source 
Much of Nexenta's business comes from partners that provide hardware and services alongside Nexenta software. The company's software is pre-installed on storage systems from vendors including Supermicro, Cisco Systems and Dell.

Nexenta continued to contribute to free and open source software used in its products. When Oracle Corporation discontinued OpenSolaris in 2010, the company became a founding member of the illumos open source project that would replace it.

Products
Nexenta's product NexentaStor is software for network-attached storage (NAS) and storage area network (SAN) services. NexentaStor was derived from the Nexenta OS based on the illumos operating system. The software runs on commodity hardware and creates storage virtualization pools consisting of multiple hard disk drives and solid-state drives. Data can be organized in a flexible number of filesystems and block storage, and files can be accessed over the  Network File System (NFS) and CIFS protocols, while block storage uses iSCSI or Fibre Channel protocols. NexentaStor allows online snapshots to be taken of data and replicated to other systems. For high availability Nexenta uses RSF-1 cluster to build a HA storage.

References 

Companies based in Santa Clara, California
Computer companies established in 2005
Computer companies disestablished in 2019
Free software companies
Computer storage companies
Defunct computer companies of the United States
Sun Microsystems
2019 mergers and acquisitions
Software companies of the United States